Odites sucinea is a moth in the family Depressariidae. It was described by Edward Meyrick in 1915. It is found in Mozambique and South Africa.

The wingspan is about 24 mm. The forewings are whitish yellow with the costal edge fulvous ochreous. The hindwings are pale whitish ochreous.

References

Moths described in 1915
Odites
Taxa named by Edward Meyrick
Moths of Sub-Saharan Africa
Lepidoptera of Mozambique
Lepidoptera of South Africa